The French Minister is a 2013 French comedy film directed by Bertrand Tavernier. Based on Quai d'Orsay, a comic strip by Christophe Blain and Abel Lanzac, the film takes an initially comedic look at the French Foreign Ministry under Dominique de Villepin but moves into more serious territory as France, in co-operation with Germany, opposes the 2003 Invasion of Iraq.

It was screened in the Special Presentation section at the 2013 Toronto International Film Festival. In January 2014, the film received three nominations at the 39th César Awards, with Niels Arestrup winning the award for Best Supporting Actor.

Plot
After graduating from the École nationale d'administration, which trains France's leaders in the public and private sectors, Arthur Vlaminck lands a job as speechwriter in the Foreign Ministry. Existing senior advisers do not welcome a talented newcomer who may become a competitor but his abilities are recognised by the Minister and, most important, by Maupas, the career official heading the department. That said, coming up with the right words for the constantly changing world situation and the constantly changing reactions of the Minister proves no easy task. He gets hastily written drafts past Maupas, and past other senior advisers who rubbish them, only to find that the Minister's needs have changed. The film ends in February 2003 with a re-enactment of the actual speech by Dominique de Villepin to the UN Security Council, at which he contradicted claims by Colin Powell and Donald Rumsfeld and argued passionately for disarmament of Iraq but not invasion.

Cast

 Thierry Lhermitte as Alexandre Taillard de Worms (based on Dominique de Villepin), French Minister of Foreign Affairs
 Raphaël Personnaz as Arthur Vlaminck, a young speechwriter
 Niels Arestrup as Claude Maupas, the phlegmatic civil servant who actually runs the ministry
 Julie Gayet as Valérie Dumontheil, special adviser on Africa 
 Jane Birkin as Molly Hutchinson, winner of the Nobel Prize for Literature
 Anaïs Demoustier as Marina, Arthur's fiancée
 Alix Poisson as Odile, Maupas' secretary
 Sonia Rolland as Nathalie, special adviser on relations with Parliament
 Marie Bunel as Martine, the minister's secretary
 Thomas Chabrol as Sylvain Marquet, special adviser on Europe
 François Perrot as Antoine Taillard

Locations
The film includes scenes shot in Berlin, near the Reichstag, Dakar, as a fictional African country, and the United Nations Building in New York.

Quoted material
 The film sections are preceded by quotations from the Fragments of the Greek philosopher Heraclitus.
 The final speech at the UN is taken from de Villepin's address on Iraq at the United Nations Security Council on 14 February 2003.

References

External links
 

2013 films
2013 comedy films
2010s French-language films
Films à clef
Films about diplomats
Films about politicians
Films based on French comics
Films directed by Bertrand Tavernier
Films scored by Philippe Sarde
Films set in 2002
Films set in 2003
Films shot in Berlin
Films shot in New York City
Films shot in Senegal
French comedy films
Live-action films based on comics
Pathé films
2010s French films